Collix ghosha is a moth in the family Geometridae. It was described by Francis Walker in 1862. It is found in the Indo-Australian tropics, from the Indian subregion, Sri Lanka to Queensland, Japan and New Caledonia.

Description
Palpi with the second joint reaching far beyond the frontal tuft. Mid tibia of the male very much dilated and with a deep groove. Ground color of the body greyish brown. The waved lines are more prominent. A postmedial series of pale specks are more or less developed, and the submarginal series obsolescent. Ventral side whitish. Discocellular spots larger. The postmedial band replaced by a streak series, which at middle almost join the submarginal spots, which form an almost complete band except between veins 3 and 4.

The larvae feed on Ardisia and Embelia species. They prefer the young leaves. The larvae have a rosy-pinkish-green body and a yellow-green head. Pupation takes place in a sparse cocoon which is made in a curled leaf of the host plant.

References

ghosha
Moths described in 1862
Moths of Asia
Moths of Japan
Moths of Sri Lanka
Taxa named by Francis Walker (entomologist)